The Pakowhai River is a river of the Wairarapa, in the Wellington Region of New Zealand's North Island. It flows initially north then east from its sources northeast of Masterton, reaching the Mataikona River  from the coast of the Pacific Ocean.

See also
List of rivers of New Zealand

References

Rivers of the Wellington Region
Rivers of New Zealand